Under Western Eyes is a 1996 Israeli drama film written and directed by Joseph Pitchhadze. It was entered into the 47th Berlin International Film Festival.

Cast
 Giora Asaulov as Singer
 Fitcho Ben-Zur as Yoshua
 Carmel Betto as Carmi
 Pavel Citronal as Igor's Father
 Amnon Fisher as Actor
 Liat Glick as Tom
 Yochanan Harison
 Ezra Kafri as Wolf
 Yehuda Lazarovitch as Igor
 Ludmila Loben as Liza
 Ricardo Rojstaczer
 Eyal Shehter as Gary Razumov
 Gideon Shemer as Itzhak
 Galina Swidansky as Igor's Mother

References

External links

1996 films
1990s Hebrew-language films
1996 drama films
Israeli drama films